Tangerine Records is the name of at least two different record labels:

 Tangerine Records (1962) - a United States-based company
 Tangerine Records (1990) - a United Kingdom-based company
 Tangerine Records (1992) - a United Kingdom-based mod and powerpop record company

See also
 List of record labels